Nallur can refer to:


Places

India
 Nallur, Anantapur district, Andhra Pradesh
 Nallur, Erode, Tamil Nadu
 Nallur, Kanyakumari, Tamil Nadu
 Nallur, Tirunelveli, Tamil Nadu
 Nallur, Tirupur, Tamil Nadu
 South Nallur, Coimbatore district, Tamil Nadu
 Nallur, a village in Balkonda mandala, Nizamabad district, Telangana

Sri Lanka
 Nallur Electoral District, a former electoral district in Sri Lanka
 Nallur, Jaffna, a town in the district of Jaffna, Sri Lanka

See also
 Nellore, Andhra Pradesh